Reticulidia suzanneae is a species of sea slug, a dorid nudibranch, a shell-less marine gastropod mollusk in the family Phyllidiidae.

Distribution
This species has been found in the eastern Indian Ocean in East Africa and Thailand, as well as Kenya, India and Malaysia.

Description
Reticulidia suzanneae is easily distinguishable from other species of Phyllidiidae. This species has a high, oval, bright yellow body with a notal surface covered in ridges. It has at least one large black spot. The ridges on the body are crested with white. R. suzanneae has orange rhinophores with 18 lamellae.

References

Phyllidiidae
Gastropods described in 2002